George Evans (January 12, 1797April 6, 1867) was an American lawyer and politician from the state of Maine. A member of the United States Whig Party, he served in both houses of the United States Congress and as Speaker of the Maine House of Representatives.

Early life and career
Evans was born in Hallowell, Massachusetts (now in Maine) where he grew up. He graduated from Bowdoin College where he had been a prominent member of the Peucinian Society. He studied law with Frederic Allen of Gardiner, and settled there to practice.

He was elected to the Maine House of Representatives and served from 1826 to 1830; from 1829 to 1830 he was the Speaker of the House.

Tenure in Congress
In 1829, he was elected to a seat in the United States House of Representatives in a special election called after Peleg Sprague resigned to take a seat in the United States Senate. Evans served in the House from 1829 to 1841. He served as chairman of the committee on expenditures of the department of the treasury from 1829 to 1831.

In 1841, Evans resigned from the House to take a seat in the United States Senate. He served as chairman of the Senate Committee on Manufactures from 1841 to 1843, chairman of the Committee on Finance from 1841 to 1845 and chairman of the Committee on Territories from 1845 to 1847. James G. Blaine later wrote of Evans's renown in, among other things, matters of finance:

Evans served in the Senate until 1847 when he was defeated in an attempt to be reelected to a second term.

Career after Congress
Evans then practiced law in Portland, Maine and continued to be involved in politics. From 1849 to 1850, he served as chairman of the commission that determined and settled the financial claims of U.S. citizens against Mexico; the United States had assumed these claims under the terms of the Treaty of Guadalupe Hidalgo following the Mexican–American War.  He also served as Maine Attorney General during the 1850s.

Slave ownership
According to research conducted in 2022 by The Washington Post, Evans owned at least one slave during his lifetime. He was identified as the only member of Congress from Maine to have owned a human being.

Death
He died in Portland, Maine and is buried in the Oak Grove Cemetery in Gardiner, Maine.

References

 
 

1797 births
1867 deaths
People from Hallowell, Maine
American people of Welsh descent
National Republican Party members of the United States House of Representatives from Maine
Whig Party members of the United States House of Representatives from Maine
Whig Party United States senators from Maine
Maine Attorneys General
Members of the Maine House of Representatives
Maine lawyers
American slave owners
People from Gardiner, Maine
19th-century American lawyers
Bowdoin College alumni
United States senators who owned slaves